Uma Canção para Ti was a live show aired in Portugal, that had the goal of showing young talents from 7 to 15 years old. Started in 2008 and ending in 2011. The program revived in 2022, with the fifth season being announced to premiere in June.

Winners
This is the list of the winners of Uma Canção para Ti. Miguel Guerreiro won the first season, David Gomes won the second, Guilherme Azevedo won the third and Pedro Ferreira won the fourth season. In 2022, Leonor Quinteiro became the first female contestant to win.

1st season
This first season was won by Miguel Guerreiro, a teen with ten years old who shocked everyone with his big voice. He has already come to France and Japan.

Results

2nd season
The second season was a little bit different. The competition was split in three stages, each with 12 teens. At the end of every stage, three finalists are determined and then, there is the Grand Finale with the 9 finalists. The winner was David Gomes, a young boy with 12 years old, who showed his humble and pure voice to the whole Portugal.

1st stage

2nd stage

3rd stage

Finale

Results

3rd season
The winner of season 3 was Guilherme Azevedo

1st stage

2nd stage

3rd stage

4th stage

Finals

Results

4th season
 The winner of season 4 was Pedro Ferreira

1st stage

2nd stage

Results

5th season
This fifth season marks the return of the show 11 years after.
The winner was 11 year old Leonor Quinteiro, the first female contestant to win the talent show.

1st stage

2nd stage

3rd stage

Finals

Results

References 
 

2008 Portuguese television series debuts
2012 Portuguese television series endings
2000s Portuguese television series
2010s Portuguese television series